Maryland's 4th congressional district special election of 2008 took place on June 17, 2008 to fill the seat in the United States House of Representatives left vacant by the resignation of Maryland congressman Albert Wynn.  Democrat Donna Edwards won the election by a large margin.

Background
Maryland's 4th congressional district seat was vacant after Congressman Albert Wynn resigned on May 31, 2008. Maryland Governor Martin O'Malley announced that a special election would be held on June 17, 2008 to fill the seat for the remainder of the 110th Congress. In order to save time and money, O'Malley signed legislation to allow the Democratic and Republican parties to choose candidates by committee instead of holding primaries. As expected, both parties chose the November general election nominees (who had already been nominated in primaries for that election) as their respective June special election candidates so that either winner would be positioned to run as the party incumbent in November. 

Election officials estimated the cost for holding the special election ranged from $1.05 to $1.25 million, which was borne by the taxpayers of the 4th District.

Candidates
Donna Edwards (D), attorney, Democratic general election nominee, 2006 Democratic candidate for Congress
Peter James (R), public Advocate, Republican general election nominee
Thibeaux Lincecum (L)

Results

See also
List of special elections to the United States House of Representatives

External links
Donna Edwards campaign website
Peter James campaign website

References

Maryland 2008 04
Maryland 2008 04
2008 04 Special
Maryland 04 Special
United States House of Representatives 04 Special
United States House of Representatives 2008 04
Maryland 04